Central Terminal may refer to:

Central Terminal LRT station, a light rail transit station in Manila, Philippines
Buffalo Central Terminal, a historic former railroad station in Buffalo, New York, United States
Grand Central Terminal, in New York City, New York, United States

See also
Central Station (disambiguation)